Aleksandr Borisovich Vashurkin (born 3 September 1986) is a Russian sprinter who specializes in the 100 metres.

He competed at the 2010 World Indoor Championships without reaching the final. His personal best time is 6.66 seconds in the 60 metres (indoor), achieved at the 2010 World Indoor Championships in Doha.

References

1986 births
Living people
Place of birth missing (living people)
Sportspeople from Mordovia
Russian male sprinters
Mordovian State University alumni
Russian Athletics Championships winners
21st-century Russian people